First Reformed Church or variations including "Old" or otherwise may refer to:

 First Reformed Church (Orange City, Iowa)
First Reformed Church (Pella, Iowa), a Presbyterian historic site
 First Reformed Church, New Brunswick, New Jersey, listed on the NRHP in New Jersey
 First Reformed Church (Albany, New York), listed on the NRHP in New York
 Old First Reformed Church (Brooklyn, New York), listed on the NRHP in New York
 First Reformed Church (New York, New York), listed on the NRHP in New York
 First Reformed Church (Piermont, New York), listed on the NRHP in New York
 First Reformed Church of Schenectady, Schenectady, New York
 First Reformed Church (Lexington, North Carolina), listed on the NRHP in North Carolina
Old First Reformed Church (Philadelphia, Pennsylvania), a Presbyterian historic site

See also